Heinz Born (born 5 April 1952) is a Swiss athlete. He competed in the men's decathlon at the 1972 Summer Olympics.

References

1952 births
Living people
Athletes (track and field) at the 1972 Summer Olympics
Swiss decathletes
Olympic athletes of Switzerland
Place of birth missing (living people)